Fellutamides are tripeptide derivatives from Penicillium fellutanum and other fungi. They are potent proteasome inhibitor that stimulates nerve growth factor synthesis in vitro. 

Fellutamides A and F were first isolated from Aspergillus versicolor. Fellutamides C and D were first isolated from an undescribed Metulocladosporiella (Chaetothyriales).

Fellutamide B strongly inhibits the growth of the tuberculosis-causing bacterium Mycobacterium tuberculosis. Its biosynthetic pathway has been determined in the filamentous fungus Aspergillus nidulans.

References 

Penicillium
Tripeptides